The Men's scratch at the 2014 UCI Track Cycling World Championships was held on 27 February 2014. 20 cyclists participated in the contest, which was contested over 60 laps, equating to a distance of .

Medalists

Results
The race was started at 19:25.

References

2014 UCI Track Cycling World Championships
UCI Track Cycling World Championships – Men's scratch